General Railway Signal Company (GRS) was an American manufacturing company located in the Rochester, New York area. GRS was focused on railway signaling equipment, systems and services. The company was established in 1904 and became part of Alstom Transport in 1998. GRS was a member of the Dow Jones Industrial Average from 1928 to 1930.

History
GRS was founded in 1904 with the merger of three companies (Pneumatic Signal Company of Rochester, New York; Taylor Signal Co. of Buffalo, New York and Standard Railroad Signal Company of Arlington, New Jersey). In 1923 GRS acquired the Federal Signal Company of Albany, New York.

General Railway Signal was one of the 30 stocks when the Dow Jones Industrial Average was expanded from a 20-stock average on October 1, 1928. It was replaced in the DJIA by Liggett & Myers on July 18, 1930. In 1965, General Signal Corporation (GSX) was created with the intent to diversify into areas other than railway signaling. GRS was a wholly owned subsidiary of GSX.

In 1960, GRS opened the "General Railway Signal Company de Argentina" (GRSA) division in Buenos Aires, which provided manufacture, installation and technical support of GRS railroad signalling systems in Argentina. Some local railroad lines that were provided with GRSA products were Belgrano Norte, Belgrano Sur, Urquiza and Sarmiento. Most of the signals remain active. Among their products are railroad crossing signalling parts, branded with the GRSA logo, instead of the usual GRS. This facility was closed in the early 1980s.

In 1986, GRS joined with China National Railway Signal & Communication Group Corporation (CRSC) to form the Chinese-American Signal Company (CASCO) in Shanghai, China, which produces products and systems for railways in the People's Republic of China.

In 1989, GRS was acquired by the Italian company Sasib and joined the Sasib Railways group. From its founding until 1993, GRS main office and manufacturing facilities were located at 801 West Avenue in Rochester. In 1993, it moved to two new suburban facilities: administration and engineering to Sawgrass Drive in Brighton, and manufacturing to John Street in West Henrietta. In 1998, it became part of Alstom, when Alstom acquired Sasib Railways. The GRS name is no longer used. All products now use the Alstom brand.

Products

Carborne signaling equipment 
 Automatic Train Control
 Automatic Train Protection
 Automatic train stop

Wayside signaling 
 DC code systems
 Electronic communication systems
 Electronic interlocking
 Relays
 Signals
 switch machines
 track circuits
 trip stops
 yard retarders

Central control signaling 
 Computer-based Manual Control Systems
 Computer-based Traffic Management Systems
 Dark territory control systems
 Electro-mechanical centralized traffic control (cTc) machines
 Yard control systems

Clients

Railroads 

 Amtrak
 BNSF Railway
 CSX Transportation
 Kansas City Southern Railway
 Norfolk Southern Railway
 Union Pacific Railroad
 Ferrocarriles Argentinos 
 Transport Asset Holding Entity
 Estrada de Ferro Central (1933–57)
 RFFSA (1957–84)
 CBTU Rio de Janeiro (1984–98)
 Supervia 
 Canadian National Railway
 Canadian Pacific Railway
 Korean National Railroad
 Ferromex
 Transportación Ferroviaria
 ProRail

Transit 

 Bay Area
 Chicago
 Massachusetts Bay
 Metro Atlanta
 Niagara Frontier
 NJ Transit
 New York City
 Southeastern Pennsylvania
 Washington
 Toronto
 Amsterdam Municipal Transport

Major accomplishments 
 First Centralized traffic control (cTc) machine, 1927.
 "NX" (eNtrance-eXit) systems (relay-based cTc), 1937.
 First fully automated freight yard, 1955.
 Computer-based central control office, 1968.
 First fully automatic computer-planned and executed train meet, 1981.
 Microprocessor based Interlocking ("Vital Processor Interlocking"), 1986.
 Amtrak Northeast Corridor Improvement Project, 1980s.
 100th Anniversary, 2004.

See also
 History General Signal Building in Buffalo
 Union Switch and Signal, the other major US railway signaling company.
 North American railroad signals

References

External links

 Alstom Signaling division
 Photos of GRS Model 2A Dwarf Signal - introduced 1908
 John Street location 
 Sawgrass Drive location 
 West Avenue location 

Manufacturing companies established in 1904
Railway signalling manufacturers
Defunct companies based in New York (state)
Former components of the Dow Jones Industrial Average
American companies disestablished in 1998
Alstom
Manufacturing companies based in Rochester, New York
American companies established in 1904
Manufacturing companies disestablished in 1998